Clare Maree Bowen (born 12 May 1984) is an Australian actress and singer, best known for her role as Scarlett O'Connor in the ABC/CMT musical-drama television series Nashville. Alongside her music releases from Nashville and her solo debut album, Bowen also records with her husband Brandon Young as Bowen*Young.

Early life and education

Bowen was born in Australia on 12 May 1984. Her parents Tony and Kathleen worked for Qantas and she spent time overseas as a child, including a stint with her family in Zimbabwe. Bowen is a cancer survivor, having had the disease between the ages of four and seven. She lived in Stanwell Park on the South Coast of New South Wales and attended primary school in Dulwich Hill, a suburb of Sydney. Bowen has a younger brother, Timothy, who is a musician.

Bowen attended the University of Wollongong in New South Wales, Australia, where she received a Bachelor of Creative Arts degree in 2006.

She is of Irish and Scottish descent

Career
Bowen appeared as the female lead in the Australian drama film The Combination in 2009 and has guest starred in The Cut, Gangs of Oz, Chandon Pictures and Home and Away. In 2010, Bowen was cast in the leading role of Wendla Bergman, in the Australian production of Spring Awakening, directed by Geordie Brookman, artistically overseen by Cate Blanchett at the Sydney Theatre Company.

In 2012, Bowen landed a series regular role on the ABC drama series Nashville written by Academy Award winner Callie Khouri. The series was picked up by ABC on 11 May 2012.

On 21 January 2014, the Zac Brown Band – featuring Bowen – released a live version of their No. 1 hit from 2010, "Free", with a transition into the famous Van Morrison song "Into the Mystic".

Bowen is also preparing her first solo album, scheduled for 2015, about which she spoke in an interview with Rolling Stone: "We've recorded a couple things and I've been writing and writing and writing." Her self-titled debut album was eventually released on 31 August 2018.

On 15 September 2022, it was announced that Bowen and her husband would be releasing their debut album as a duo in early 2023 and they previewed a song titled "Skeletons".

Personal life
In 2013, Bowen posed nude for the May issue of Allure magazine - alongside Naya Rivera, Jennifer Morrison, and Christa Miller.

In December 2015, Bowen became engaged to musician Brandon Robert Young, who proposed at the Grand Ole Opry. They were married on 21 October 2017.

Filmography

Film

Television

Stage
 Candide (2003)
 Our Town as Mrs. Webb (2004)
 The Good Doctor as The Mistress (2005)
 Metamorphoses as Alcyone and Pomona (2006)
 Peer Gynt as Peer Gynt (2006)
 4 Plays About Wollongong (2009)
 Hat's Off/Spring Awakening as Wendla Bergman (2010)

Discography

Studio albums

with Nashville

Singles

 ADid not enter the Hot 100 but charted on Bubbling Under Hot 100 Singles.

Music videos

Style and inspiration
Sonically, Bowen's music fits the Americana genre but also contains elements of pop, folk, country and adult contemporary music.

When asked which musicians inspire her music, Bowen stated "Dolly Parton is probably the biggest one. She tells such wonderful stories and she’s so honest and she’s her. She makes fun of herself. She knows how to be silly and she knows how to be serious. She can lift people up after she’s told them a really heavy story. I think she’s just a really marvellous storyteller. She’s always been a big inspiration to me". She also added that she "loved the way Alison Krauss sings and the stories she tells" and professes her love of Johnny Cash and June Carter Cash, Australian pop star Tina Arena and musical theatre legend Stephen Sondheim. Bowen asserts that Buddy Miller is her "ultimate music mentor" as he is "the one who taught [her] to use a microphone when [she] first got to Nashville", adding that he and his wife Julie "make such beautiful music together".

References

External links
 

1984 births
Australian country singers
Australian film actresses
Australian stage actresses
Australian television actresses
Australian expatriate actresses in the United States
Living people
University of Wollongong alumni
21st-century Australian actresses
21st-century Australian singers